Coquerel is a French surname. Notable people with the surname include:

Athanase Laurent Charles Coquerel (1795–1868), French Protestant theologian
Athanase Josué Coquerel (1820–1875), French Protestant theologian
Charles Coquerel (1822–1867), French navy surgeon, algologist and entomologist
Flora Coquerel (born 1994), French model
Frédéric Coquerel (born 1978), French footballer
Éric Coquerel (born 1958), French politician

Surnames of French origin